Agiokampos is a village in the municipality of Agia (section Skiti), in the Larissa regional unit in Greece. It has 285 inhabitants (2001 census). It is a beach resort.

Agiokampos' beach along with Velika's and Sotiritsa's has a length of 10.5 km (~6.5 miles) and are the most popular beach in the regional unit of Larissa with masses of tourists coming every summer mainly from Hungary, Czech Republic and the entire Greece.

External links
Agiokampos Information site
Guide for beaches of Larissa

Populated places in Larissa (regional unit)